When Luck Breaks the Door  is a 2005 Turkish comedy film, written and directed by Tayfun Güneyer, featuring Ferhan Şensoy as a man who takes his family on a holiday to a Caribbean island at the centre of a CIA assassination plot. It was mostly shot on location in Cuba.

Plot
When Kuddusi Yurdum misses the final answer on the TV gameshow "Şans Kapıyı Kırınca", his family is given a consolation prize: a vacation to Barboonia, a fictional "banana republic" island country near Cuba. They are welcomed there by the country's dictator President Carlos, in order to stop an assassination plot by the CIA.

Cast
Ferhan Şensoy as Kuddusi / Presidente Carlos (Carlos Romário Mustafa Ibrahim Salvador del Puento González Salgado)
Asuman Dabak as Nermin (Kuddusi's wife)
Zeki Alasya as Father Alfonso
İlkay Saran as Lezize (Kuddusi's mother-in-law, Nermin's mother)
Rasim Öztekin as José Ricardo
Necmi Yapıcı as Ercan (Kuddusi's brother-in-law, Nermin's brother)
Fethi Kantarcı as Yaman (Kuddusi's son)
Alev Gezer as Ebru (Kuddusi's daughter)
Ayça Tekindor as Princess Maria
Sinan Çetin as  Hotel Bonita Cocierge
Doğa Rutkay as Air Hostess
Tamer Karadağlı as the Pilot
Memet Ali Alabora as Flight Passenger 1
İpek Tuzcuoğlu as Flight Passenger 2
Hakan Yılmaz as Presenter (of the TV gameshow)

References

External links

2005 films
2000s Turkish-language films
2005 comedy films
Films set in Turkey
Turkish comedy films